The Embassy of Norway in London at 25 Belgrave Square is the diplomatic mission of Norway in the United Kingdom. The embassy is located on Belgrave Square in a building it has occupied since 1949.

The embassy is situated in a c.1825 stucco terrace designed by George Basevi on Belgrave Square in Belgravia, Westminster, London. The building is part of a single group of Grade I listed buildings at 25—36 Belgrave Square.

See also
 List of diplomats from Norway to the United Kingdom

References

External links

Norwegian Arts: the Embassy's Norwegian Culture and Events page

Belgravia
Norway
London
George Basevi buildings
Grade I listed buildings in the City of Westminster
Grade I listed houses in London
Houses completed in 1825
Norway–United Kingdom relations